Martin Flavin (1841– 30 December 1916)  was an Irish nationalist politician, butter merchant and prominent businessman  from Cork. He was a Member of Parliament (MP) from 1891 to 1892 .

Flavin was chairman of the Cork-Macroom Railway Co. and was a director of the Cork Imperial Hotel Co. Being an Alderman on Cork Corporation in 1891, he was selected to stand for election  to the United Kingdom House of Commons as an Anti-Parnellite Irish National Federation candidate at a by-election held on 6 November 1891 for the Cork City constituency, to fill the vacancy caused by Parnell's death. He won the by-election with a large majority, defeating both the future  Irish nationalist leader, John Redmond and a Unionist candidate,  but  due to ill-health  he did not stand at the next general election, held in July 1892, when both of Cork City's two seats were won by Anti-Parnellites.

He died at his Summerhill, Cork residence on 30 December 1916.

Notes

External links 
 
 

1841 births
1916 deaths
Members of the Parliament of the United Kingdom for Cork City
UK MPs 1886–1892
Anti-Parnellite MPs